Eois atrostrigata is a moth in the  family Geometridae. It is found in Australia (Queensland).

References

Moths described in 1894
atrostrigata
Moths of Australia